Earl Lincoln Poole (1891–1972) was an American wildlife artist, sculptor, author, and naturalist. He was born on October 30, 1891 in Haddonfield, New Jersey.

Published versions of his illustrations appeared in Birds of Virginia (1913) and Bird Studies at Old Cape May (1937).

After completing high school, Poole attended the Pennsylvania Academy of the Fine Arts and was a Jessup Scholar at the Philadelphia Academy of Natural Sciences. He undertook teaching duties at the Reading Boy's High School in 1915, guided by Dr. Levi Mengel (Director of the Reading Public Museum at the time), and was subsequently promoted to Director of Art Education.

In 1920, Poole was transferred to the Reading Public Museum (though he still served as Supervisor of Art at Reading Boy's High School until 1930) and was named Assistant Director of the museum in 1925 and Director in 1938. His papers are held at Drexel University.

Poole was also the founder of the Baird Ornithological Club and helped to establish the Hawk Mountain Sanctuary.

Berks Nature, a nonprofit land trust, has a 30+ acre preserve named after Earl Poole in Alsace Township, Berks County, Pennsylvania

References

External links
 Askart.com (registration may be required)
 Artwork by Earl Lincoln Poole

1891 births
1972 deaths
People from Haddonfield, New Jersey
American bird artists
20th-century American painters
American male painters
20th-century American male artists